The 2006 National Leagues (known as the LHF Healthplan National Leagues) are the second, third and fourth divisions of rugby league in the UK.

The League One and League Three Grand Finals, and the League Two Play-off final were played at Warrington's Halliwell Jones Stadium on 8 October 2006.

National League One
National League One was won by Hull Kingston Rovers, who as a result entered Super League for the first time. They had led the league for the majority of the season and defeated Widnes Vikings in the final. York City Knights and Oldham R.L.F.C. were relegated to National Two.

Table

Results

Round 1

Whitehaven 26 Batley Bulldogs 8

Doncaster Lakers 0 Rochdale Hornets 44

Halifax 10 Leigh Centurions 32

Oldham R.L.F.C. 8 Hull Kingston Rovers 48

Widnes Vikings 25 York City Knights 18

Round 2

Doncaster Lakers 32 Whitehaven 32

Batley Bulldogs 6 |Halifax 26

Rochdale Hornets 28 Oldham R.L.F.C. 10

Leigh Centurions 53 Widnes Vikings 4

York City Knights 18 Hull Kingston Rovers 51

Round 3

Whitehaven 38 Rochdale Hornets 24

Halifax 34 York City Knights 24

Oldham R.L.F.C. 10 Doncaster Lakers 56

Widnes Vikings 52 Batley Bulldogs 6

Hull Kingston Rovers 30 Leigh Centurions 6

Round 4

Whitehaven 16 Widnes Vikings 38

Rochdale Hornets 30 York City Knights 16

Hull Kingston Rovers 30 |Halifax 22

Batley Bulldogs 24 Doncaster Lakers 32

Leigh Centurions 44 Oldham R.L.F.C. 12

Round 5

Widnes Vikings 28 Hull Kingston Rovers 42

York City Knights 10 Leigh Centurions 24

Halifax 18 Rochdale Hornets 12

Doncaster Lakers 22 Batley Bulldogs 24

Oldham R.L.F.C. 10 Whitehaven 48

Round 6

Leigh Centurions 25 Doncaster Lakers 18

Whitehaven 30 |Halifax 20

Rochdale Hornets 38 Widnes Vikings 46

Hull Kingston Rovers 80 Oldham R.L.F.C. 6

Batley Bulldogs 41 York City Knights 34

Round 7

Doncaster Lakers 24 Hull Kingston Rovers 28

York City Knights 18 Widnes Vikings 40

Halifax 34 Oldham R.L.F.C. 28

Rochdale Hornets 32 Whitehaven 6

Batley Bulldogs 14 Leigh Centurions 8

Round 8

Hull Kingston Rovers 74 Whitehaven 12

Widnes Vikings 34 Doncaster Lakers 12

Oldham R.L.F.C. 0 York City Knights 62

Leigh Centurions 30 Rochdale Hornets 16

Halifax 8 Batley Bulldogs 24

Round 9

Whitehaven 32 Leigh Centurions 22

Doncaster Lakers 22 |Halifax 18

York City Knights 56 Oldham R.L.F.C. 14

Rochdale Hornets 16 Hull Kingston Rovers 66

Batley Bulldogs 36 Widnes Vikings 38

Round 10

Leigh Centurions 38 |Halifax 36

York City Knights 30 Doncaster Lakers 44

Oldham R.L.F.C. 18 Rochdale Hornets 22

Hull Kingston Rovers 42 Batley Bulldogs 8

Widnes Vikings 26 Whitehaven 12

Round 11

Doncaster Lakers 22 Leigh Centurions 34

Halifax 14 Hull Kingston Rovers 38

Whitehaven 42 York City Knights 24

Batley Bulldogs 26 Rochdale Hornets 12

Widnes Vikings 72 Oldham R.L.F.C. 18

Round 12

Rochdale Hornets 28 Doncaster Lakers 30

Leigh Centurions 12 Whitehaven 22

York City Knights 24 |Halifax 37

Hull Kingston Rovers 49 Widnes Vikings 24

Oldham R.L.F.C. 8 Batley Bulldogs 40

Round 13

Rochdale Hornets 28 Leigh Centurions 29

Batley Bulldogs 12 Whitehaven 20

Halifax 22 Widnes Vikings 42

Hull Kingston Rovers 21 York City Knights 10

Doncaster Lakers 58 Oldham R.L.F.C. 10

Round 14

Oldham are relegated to National League 2 following their 14th defeat of the season. York look certain to join them.

Leigh Centurions 36 Hull Kingston Rovers 10

Whitehaven 22 Doncaster Lakers 12

Oldham R.L.F.C. 8 |Halifax 56

Widnes Vikings 18 Rochdale Hornets 31

York City Knights 20 Batley Bulldogs 26

Round 15

Hull KR are very close to taking the league leadership into the play-offs. Widnes are now in second place and York cling to National One by their fingertips.

Widnes Vikings 32 Leigh Centurions 16

Hull Kingston Rovers 26 Rochdale Hornets 12

Halifax 40 Doncaster Lakers 24

Batley Bulldogs 44 Oldham R.L.F.C. 16

York City Knights 28 Whitehaven 18

Round 16

York go down fighting with their second straight win.

Oldham R.L.F.C. 28 Widnes Vikings 78

Leigh Centurions 28 Batley Bulldogs 10

Rochdale Hornets 24 |Halifax 14

Doncaster Lakers 28 York City Knights 44

Whitehaven 48 Hull Kingston Rovers 12

Round 17

Hull KR are confirmed as Minor Premiers and will have home advantage in the semi-final of the play-offs.

Oldham R.L.F.C. 12 Leigh Centurions 52

Batley Bulldogs 24 Hull Kingston Rovers 28

Halifax 18 Whitehaven 26

Doncaster Lakers 0 Widnes Vikings 56

York City Knights 24 Rochdale Hornets 18

Round 18

Leigh Centurions 60 York City Knights 16

Hull Kingston Rovers 30 Doncaster Lakers 22

Whitehaven 66 Oldham R.L.F.C. 4

Widnes Vikings 76 |Halifax 34

Rochdale Hornets 47 Batley Bulldogs 20

Play-offs

Elimination matches, 17 September

Leigh Centurions 22–23 Batley Bulldogs

Whitehaven 38–10 Rochdale Hornets

Semi-final, 24 September

Hull Kingston Rovers 29–22 Widnes Vikings

Elimination match, 24 September

Whitehaven 30–0 Batley Bulldogs

Semi-final, 1 October

Widnes Vikings 24–20 Whitehaven

Grand Final

National League One Grand Final, Sunday 8 October

Hull Kingston Rovers 29–16 Widnes Vikings

National League Two
National League Two was won by Dewsbury Rams, who only sealed the title on the last day of the season. Runners-up Sheffield Eagles won the play-off final against Swinton, who won through the play-offs by beating Barrow Raiders, Featherstone Rovers and Celtic Crusaders, who they beat in rugby league's first ever golden point extra time.

Table

Results

Round 1

Sheffield Eagles 44 Keighley Cougars 12

Featherstone Rovers 36 Gateshead Thunder 24

Workington Town 18 Celtic Crusaders 50

Swinton Lions 22 Barrow Raiders 20

London Skolars 30 Dewsbury Rams 34

Blackpool Panthers 14 Hunslet Hawks 12

Round 2

Dewsbury Rams 22 Keighley Cougars 16

Featherstone Rovers 30 Sheffield Eagles 56

Workington Town 30 Barrow Raiders 22

Celtic Crusaders 70 London Skolars 0

Swinton Lions 56 Blackpool Panthers 24

Hunslet Hawks 10 Gateshead Thunder 19

Round 3

Keighley Cougars 18 Hunslet Hawks 24

Sheffield Eagles 22 Celtic Crusaders 20

Barrow Raiders 26 Featherstone Rovers 24

London Skolars 24 Swinton Lions 38

Blackpool Panthers 16 Dewsbury Rams 36

Gateshead Thunder 54 Workington Town 6

Round 4

Keighley Cougars 34 Blackpool Panthers 24

Hunslet Hawks 20 London Skolars 16

Barrow Raiders 32 Celtic Crusaders 16

Swinton Lions 26 Gateshead Thunder 21

Dewsbury Rams 27 Featherstone Rovers 28

Sheffield Eagles 44 Workington Town 46

Round 5

Gateshead Thunder 38 Keighley Cougars 18

London Skolars 32 Barrow Raiders 34

Celtic Crusaders 36 Hunslet Hawks 16

Featherstone Rovers 16 Blackpool Panthers 6

Workington Town 23 Swinton Lions 18

Dewsbury Rams 27 Sheffield Eagles 12

Round 6

Sheffield Eagles 38 Gateshead Thunder 14

Keighley Cougars 30 Celtic Crusaders 30

Blackpool Panthers 12 London Skolars 30

Barrow Raiders 12 Swinton Lions 16

Hunslet Hawks 14 Featherstone Rovers 14

Workington Town 15 Dewsbury Rams 22

Round 7

Gateshead Thunder 16 Barrow Raiders 40

Celtic Crusaders 52 Blackpool Panthers 16

London Skolars 10 Sheffield Eagles 38

Swinton Lions 18 Dewsbury Rams 22

Hunslet Hawks 22 Keighley Cougars 4

Featherstone Rovers 19 Workington Town 12

Round 8

Barrow Raiders 46 London Skolars 16

Dewsbury Rams 42 Celtic Crusaders 4

Blackpool Panthers 8 Swinton Lions 44

Sheffield Eagles 34 Hunslet Hawks 20

Keighley Cougars 22 Featherstone Rovers 24

Workington Town 24 Gateshead Thunder 33

Round 9

Barrow Raiders 34 Workington Town 22

London Skolars 32 Blackpool Panthers 32

Celtic Crusaders 58 Keighley Cougars 18

Swinton Lions 54 Hunslet Hawks 22

Gateshead Thunder 27 Sheffield Eagles 26

Featherstone Rovers 34 Dewsbury Rams 14

Round 10

Sheffield Eagles 29 Barrow Raiders 8

Workington Town 28 Featherstone Rovers 26

Swinton Lions 18 Celtic Crusaders 50

Hunslet Hawks 45 Blackpool Panthers 22

Keighley Cougars 20 Gateshead Thunder 31

Dewsbury Rams 60 London Skolars 0

Round 11

Celtic Crusaders 28 Sheffield Eagles 12

Barrow Raiders 17 Hunslet Hawks 16

Featherstone Rovers 27 Swinton Lions 24

Blackpool Panthers 22 Keighley Cougars 18

Gateshead Thunder 16 Dewsbury Rams 20

London Skolars 16 Workington Town 30

Round 12

Sheffield Eagles 44 Featherstone Rovers 28

Keighley Cougars 26 Barrow Raiders 18

Hunslet Hawks 12 Dewsbury Rams 42
 
Swinton Lions 46 Workington Town 30

Blackpool Panthers 6 Gateshead Thunder 24

London Skolars 4 Celtic Crusaders 48

Round 13

Barrow Raiders 12 Sheffield Eagles 32

Featherstone Rovers 50 Keighley Cougars 32

Workington Town 30 Hunslet Hawks 12

Dewsbury Rams 66 Blackpool Panthers 6

Gateshead Thunder 36 London Skolars 6

Celtic Crusaders 10 Swinton Lions 21

Round 14

Barrow Raiders 48 Gateshead Thunder 10

Swinton Lions 14 Sheffield Eagles 24

Featherstone Rovers 54 London Skolars 6

Keighley Cougars 12 Dewsbury Rams 36

Hunslet Hawks 12 Celtic Crusaders 34

Blackpool Panthers 18 Workington Town 16

Round 15

Celtic Crusaders 42 Barrow Raiders 12

Dewsbury Rams 27 Hunslet Hawks 20

Gateshead Thunder 36 Blackpool Panthers 38

London Skolars 31 Keighley Cougars 6

Swinton Lions 26 Featherstone Rovers 22

Workington Town 10 Sheffield Eagles 70

Round 16

Blackpool Panthers 0 Celtic Crusaders 52

Hunslet Hawks 24 Swinton Lions 24

Dewsbury Rams 36 Gateshead Thunder 8

Sheffield Eagles 46 London Skolars 0

Keighley Cougars 19 Workington Town 12

Featherstone Rovers 32 Barrow Raiders 8

Round 17

Celtic Crusaders 18 Dewsbury Rams 38

Gateshead Thunder 22 Featherstone Rovers 36

Sheffield Eagles 18 Swinton Lions 14

London Skolars 24 Hunslet Hawks 16

Workington Town 58 Blackpool Panthers 20

Barrow Raiders 38 Keighley Cougars 14

Round 18

Celtic Crusaders 22 Gateshead Thunder 26

Keighley Cougars 28 Swinton Lions 6

London Skolars 31 Featherstone Rovers 12

Hunslet Hawks 18 Workington Town 44

Blackpool Panthers 20 Sheffield Eagles 40

Dewsbury Rams 24 Barrow Raiders 14

Round 19

Gateshead Thunder 26 Hunslet Hawks 18

Workington Town 50 Keighley Cougars 18

Swinton Lions 58 London Skolars 12

Featherstone Rovers 11 Celtic Crusaders 10

Barrow Raiders 36 Blackpool Panthers 14

Sheffield Eagles 21 Dewsbury Rams 20

Round 20

Dewsbury close in on automatic promotion but Sheffield keep chasing.

Blackpool Panthers 28 Featherstone Rovers 38

Hunslet Hawks 16 Barrow Raiders 36

Keighley Cougars 14 Sheffield Eagles 58

Dewsbury Rams 20 Swinton Lions 12

London Skolars 16 Gateshead Thunder 26

Celtic Crusaders 38 Workington Town 10

Round 21

Sheffield Eagles 52 Blackpool Panthers 0

Featherstone Rovers 34 Hunslet Hawks 24

Swinton Lions 54 Keighley Cougars 10

Barrow Raiders 26 Dewsbury Rams 28

Gateshead Thunder 16 Celtic Crusaders 28

Workington Town 28 London Skolars 18

Round 22

Dewsbury sealed automatic promotion to National League One with a comeback victory over Workington. The Sheffield Eagles finish second after their eleventh straight win.

Blackpool Panthers 4 Barrow Raiders 60

Celtic Crusaders 14 Featherstone Rovers 11

Dewsbury Rams 30 Workington Town 16

Gateshead Thunder 16 Swinton Lions 32

Hunslet Hawks 16 Sheffield Eagles 48

Keighley Cougars 32 London Skolars 44

Play-offs

Elimination matches, 17 September

Featherstone Rovers 46–18 Gateshead Thunder

Swinton Lions 26–20 Barrow Raiders

Semi-final, 22 September

Sheffield Eagles 26–16 Celtic Crusaders

Elimination match, 24 September

Featherstone Rovers 14–27 Swinton Lions

Semi-final, 1 October

This game was the first rugby league match in the UK to be settled in golden point extra time. After 80 minutes the score was 26–26. After two periods of extra time (10 minutes each) there was no further score. Two minutes into the additional overtime Swinton's Chris Hough dropped a goal to seal it for Swinton.

Celtic Crusaders 26–27 Swinton Lions

Grand Final

National League Two Grand Final, Sunday 8 October

Sheffield Eagles 35–10 Swinton Lions

National League Three
National League Three was won by Bramley Buffaloes, last year's losing finalists. The playoffs were initionally ment to involve the top 6 teams but Bradford Dudley Hill pulled out at the end of the regular season.

Table

Hillsborough Hawks withdrew after playing two matches. These results were expunged.
Bradford Dudley Hill withdrew from the play-offs.

Results

Round 1

Underbank Rangers 10 Warrington Wizards 60

Dewsbury Celtic 13 Hemel Stags 36

Featherstone Lions 20 Bradford Dudley Hill 30

St Albans Centurions 28 Gateshead Storm 14

Round 2

St Albans Centurions 6 Bramley Buffaloes 10

Featherstone Lions 10 Warrington Wizards 82

Bradford Dudley Hill 34 Dewsbury Celtic 18

Gateshead Storm 16 Underbank Rangers 32

Round 3

Hemel Stags 34 Bradford Dudley Hill 20

Bramley Buffaloes 34 Underbank Rangers 14

Featherstone Lions 14 Gateshead Storm 44

Dewsbury Celtic 42 Warrington Wizards 35

Round 4

St Albans Centurions 48 Underbank Rangers 8

Bramley Buffaloes 76 Featherstone Lions 0

Gateshead Storm 36 Dewsbury Celtic 44

Warrington Wizards 24 Hemel Stags 34

Round 5

Bradford Dudley Hill 18 Warrington Wizards 6

Featherstone Lions 10 St Albans Centurions 44

Dewsbury Celtic 18 Bramley Buffaloes 26

Hemel Stags 40 Gateshead Storm 30

Round 6

Bramley Buffaloes 20 Hemel Stags 24

Dewsbury Celtic 34 St Albans Centurions 24

Gateshead Storm 16 Bradford Dudley Hill 22

Underbank Rangers 22 Featherstone Lions 16

Round 7

Hemel Stags 20 St Albans Centurions 12

Dewsbury Celtic 52 Underbank Rangers 0

Gateshead Storm 10 Warrington Wizards 54

Bradford Dudley Hill 20 Bramley Buffaloes 22

Round 8

St Albans Centurions 42 Bradford Dudley Hill 10

Featherstone Lions 14 Dewsbury Celtic 14

Underbank Rangers 24 Hemel Stags 36
 
Bramley Buffaloes 48 Warrington Wizards 24

Round 9

Bradford Dudley Hill 34 Underbank Rangers 0

Bramley Buffaloes 70 Gateshead Storm 8

Warrington Wizards 36 St Albans Centurions 26

Hemel Stags 90 Featherstone Lions 14

Round 10

Hemel Stags 56 Dewsbury Celtic 0

Bradford Dudley Hill 56 Featherstone Lions 10

Gateshead Storm 4 St Albans Centurions 44

Warrington Wizards 50 Underbank Rangers 16

Round 11

Dewsbury Celtic 42 Bradford Dudley Hill 30

Warrington Wizards 48 Featherstone Lions 20

Bramley Buffaloes 16 St Albans Centurions 14

Underbank Rangers v Gateshead Storm – Postponed

Round 12

Bradford Dudley Hill 34 Hemel Stags 12

Warrington Wizards 36 Dewsbury Celtic 18

Underbank Rangers 12 Bramley Buffaloes 32

Gateshead Storm 26 Featherstone Lions 18

Round 13

Hemel Stags 24 Warrington Wizards 45

Dewsbury Celtic 50 Gateshead Storm 20

Underbank Rangers 10 St Albans Centurions 38

Featherstone Lions 8 Bramley Buffaloes 44

Round 14

Warrington Wizards 56 Bradford Dudley Hill 16

Gateshead Storm 6 Hemel Stags 48

St Albans Centurions 56 Featherstone Lions 28

Bramley Buffaloes 88 Dewsbury Celtic 16

Round 15

Bradford Dudley Hill 34 Gateshead Storm 36

Hemel Stags 12 Bramley Buffaloes 38

St Albans Centurions 26 Dewsbury Celtic 26

Featherstone Lions 10 Underbank Rangers 8

Round 16

Bramley Buffaloes 40 Bradford Dudley Hill 14

Warrington Wizards 24 Gateshead Storm 0

St Albans Centurions 22 Hemel Stags 6

Underbank Rangers 6 Dewsbury Celtic 32

Round 17

Bradford Dudley Hill 24 St Albans Centurions 0

Warrington Wizards 22 Bramley Buffaloes 14

Hemel Stags 58 Underbank Rangers 16

Dewsbury Celtic 66 Featherstone Lions 12

Round 18

Featherstone Lions 10 Hemel Stags 52

Gateshead Storm 24 Bramley Buffaloes 28

Underbank Rangers 44 Bradford Dudley Hill 14

St Albans Centurions 32 Warrington Wizards 18

Play-offs

Elimination match, 17 September. Bradford Dudley Hill withdrew from the play-offs.

St Albans Centurions 36–16 Dewsbury Celtic

Elimination match, 24 September

Warrington Wizards 30–12 St Albans Centurions

Semi-final, 24 September

Bramley Buffaloes 30–10 Hemel Stags

Semi-final, 1 October

Hemel Stags 27–16 Warrington Wizards

Grand Final

National League Three Grand Final, Sunday 8 October

Hemel Stags 8–30 Bramley Buffaloes

External links
Rugby Football League

See also
Rugby League Championships

RFL League 1
Rugby Football League Championship
Rugby League National Leagues
Rugby League National Leagues